Li Yuehong(born 28 August 1989) is a Chinese male sport shooter, he is the bronze medalist for 25 metre rapid fire pistol at 2016 Olympics.

He qualified to represent China at the 2020 Summer Olympics.

References

External links
 

1989 births
Living people
Sportspeople from Jinan
Sport shooters from Shandong
Chinese male sport shooters
Olympic shooters of China
2016 Olympic bronze medalists for China
Olympic medalists in shooting
Shooters at the 2016 Summer Olympics
Universiade medalists in shooting
Asian Games medalists in shooting
Asian Games gold medalists for China
Asian Games silver medalists for China
Shooters at the 2010 Asian Games
Shooters at the 2014 Asian Games
Medalists at the 2010 Asian Games
Medalists at the 2014 Asian Games
Universiade bronze medalists for China
Medalists at the 2011 Summer Universiade
Medalists at the 2013 Summer Universiade
Shooters at the 2020 Summer Olympics
Medalists at the 2020 Summer Olympics
Olympic bronze medalists for China
21st-century Chinese people